Airplane Repo is an American documentary-style fiction show following repossession agents hired by financial institutions to recover aircraft and occasionally other high-value assets from owners who have fallen behind on their payments.

History
The Discovery Channel show first premiered on December 12, 2010 with a three episode pilot season. A two-year production hiatus elapsed before a full series premiered on July 11, 2013. Agents Nick Popovich (first three episodes), Ken Cage, Mike Kennedy, Kevin Lacey and Danny Thompson (from season one) appear in the show, along with Heather Sterzick, a former military air traffic controller (from season 2). Popovich claimed that later episodes are unrealistic. Beginning with Season 3, the episode intro states that events have been recaptured and some details have been changed. This is to help clarify and explain the use of fixed-security cameras, used in the repo events, in an attempt to duplicate or produce found footage style cinematography.

Season 2 premiered on August 22, 2014. Season 3 premiered on July 15, 2015.

Episodes

Series overview

Season 0 (2010–11)

Season 1 (2013)

Season 2 (2014)

Season 3 (2015)

Broadcast
In Australia, the first season premiered on the Discovery Channel on December 10, 2013. Season 2 premiered from October 7, 2014 and the third season premiered from August 11, 2015.

References

External links

 Discovery Channel

2010 American television series debuts
Aviation television series
Discovery Channel original programming
2015 American television series endings